The 2003 Ebonyi State gubernatorial election occurred on April 19, 2003. PDP's Sam Egwu won election for a first tenure, defeating Incumbent Governor, ANPP's Lawrence Nwauruku and two other candidates.

Sam Egwu emerged winner in the PDP gubernatorial primary election. He retained Emmanuel Isu as his running mate.

Electoral system
The Governor of Ebonyi State is elected using the plurality voting system.

Results
A total of four candidates registered with the Independent National Electoral Commission to contest in the election. PDP candidate Sam Egwu won election for a second term, defeating three other candidates.

The total number of registered voters in the state was 1,002,771. However, only 80.7% (i.e. 809,224) of registered voters participated in the exercise.

References 

Ebonyi State gubernatorial elections
Ebonyi State gubernatorial election
April 2003 events in Nigeria